"Roll Like a Wheel" is a song recorded by Canadian country music artist Cassandra Vasik. It was released in 1993 as the third single from her second studio album, Feels Like Home. It peaked at number 9 on the RPM Country Tracks chart in November 1993.

Chart performance

Year-end charts

References

1993 songs
1993 singles
Cassandra Vasik songs
Epic Records singles
Songs written by Tim Thorney